Josh O'Connor (born 16 June 2004) is a Scottish professional footballer who plays for Scottish Premiership club Hibernian as a forward. He is the son of former Hibernian and Scotland player Garry O'Connor.

Club career
In January 2021, O'Connor agreed to his first professional contract with Hibernian and made his first team debut in March 2022.

Career statistics

References

2004 births
Living people
Footballers from Edinburgh
Scottish footballers
Hibernian F.C. players
Scottish Professional Football League players
Association football forwards